Loch Skae is a small, upland freshwater loch to the north of Blackcraig Hill, approximately  west of Dumfries, Scotland,  east of Loch Howie, and  south of the A702. The loch was surveyed on 29 July 1903 by James Murray as part of Sir John Murray's Bathymetrical Survey of Fresh-Water Lochs of Scotland 1897-1909.

References 

Skae
Howie